Jason Wolfe may refer to:

 Jason Wolfe (ice hockey) (born 1977), American ice hockey player and coach
 Jason Wolfe (entrepreneur), American businessman and entrepreneur
 Jason Wolfe (racing driver) (born 1994), American racing driver